TransEuropa Ferries was a freight and passenger ferry company operating between Ramsgate, Kent, UK and Ostend, West Flanders, Belgium from 1998 to 2013, with three or more ships. The company suspended operations on 18 April 2013, and on 25 April 2013 the line filed to initiate bankruptcy procedures.

History
TransEuropa Shipping Lines d.o.o. (TSL) of Koper, Slovenia started a ro-ro freight ferry service between Ramsgate and Ostend on 21 November 1998 following the closure of Sally Line's services and the purchase of assets of Regie voor Maritiem Transport from the Belgian government. TSL's Belgian subsidiary TransEuropa Ferries NV was founded on 1 June 2001 to take over the cross-channel operation.

On 20 July 2004 TransEuropa started a car and passenger ferry service from Ostend to Ramsgate to supplement their existing freight service. Foot passengers were not catered for on this crossing, which typically took four to five hours. Between 2010 and 2011 TransEuropa Ferries operated a joint service on the route with LD Lines.

The company operated via a direct sales channel, declining to sell through travel agents.

On 18 April 2013 the company stopped sailing and on 25 April is filed for bankruptcy

Former Fleet

References

Bibliography

Ferry companies of England
Ferry companies of Belgium
Connections across the English Channel